Morávek (feminine Morávková) is a Czech surname. Notable people with the surname include:

 Bill Moravek, former football player and coach
 Jan Morávek, Czech footballer
 Jan Morávek (1902–1984), member of the Czech Resistance against the German occupation (1939-1945) in Czechoslovakia
 Václav Morávek, Czech general
 Veronika Morávková, Czech ice dancer
 Vladimír Morávek (born 1965), Czech director, screenwriter, and actor

See also 
 Moravčík
 Moravec (surname)
 Moravetz
 Morawetz
 Morawitz

Czech-language surnames